The Băi is a left tributary of the river Sabar in Romania. It flows into the Sabar in Florești.

References

Rivers of Romania
Rivers of Dâmbovița County
Rivers of Giurgiu County